The Tlingit language (Lingít ) is spoken by the Tlingit people of Southeast Alaska and Western Canada and is a branch of the Na-Dene language family. Extensive effort is being put into revitalization programs in Southeast Alaska to revive and preserve the Tlingit language and culture.

Missionaries of the Russian Orthodox Church were the first to develop a written version of Tlingit by using the Cyrillic script to record and translate it when the Russian Empire had contact with Alaska and the coast of North America down to Sonoma County, California. After the Alaska Purchase, English-speaking missionaries from the United States developed a written version of the language with the Latin alphabet.

History
The history of Tlingit is poorly known, mostly because there is no written record until the first contact with Europeans around the 1790s.  Documentation was sparse and irregular until the early 20th century. The language appears to have spread northward from the Ketchikan–Saxman area towards the Chilkat region since certain conservative features are reduced gradually from south to north. The shared features between the Eyak language, found around the Copper River delta, and Tongass Tlingit, near the Portland Canal, are all the more striking for the distances that separate them, both geographic and linguistic.

Classification
Tlingit is currently classified as a distinct and separate branch of Na-Dene, an indigenous language family of North America. Edward Sapir (1915) argued for its inclusion in the Na-Dené family, a claim that was subsequently debated by Franz Boas (1917), P.E. Goddard (1920), and many other prominent linguists of the time.

Studies in the late 20th century by (Heinz-)Jürgen Pinnow (1962, 1968, 1970, int. al.) and Michael E. Krauss (1964, 1965, 1969, int. al.) showed a strong connection to Eyak and hence to the Athabaskan languages.

Sapir initially proposed a connection between Tlingit and Haida, but the debate over Na-Dene gradually excluded Haida from the discussion. Haida is now considered an isolate, with some borrowing from its long proximity with Tlingit. In 2004, the Haida linguist John Enrico presented new arguments and reopened the debate. Victor Golla writes in his 2011 California Native Languages, "John Enrico, the contemporary linguist with the deepest knowledge of Haida, continues to believe that a real, if distant, genetic relationship connects Haida to Na-Dene[.]"

Geographic distribution
The Tlingit language is distributed from near the mouth of the Copper River down the open coast of the Gulf of Alaska and throughout almost all of the islands of the Alexander Archipelago in Southeast Alaska. It is characterized by four or five distinct dialects, but they are mostly mutually intelligible. Almost all of the area where the Tlingit language is endemic is contained within the modern borders of Alaska.

The exception is an area known as "Inland Tlingit" that extends up the Taku River and into northern British Columbia and the Yukon around Atlin Lake (Áa Tleen "Big Lake") and Teslin Lake (Desleen < Tas Tleen "Big Thread") lake districts, as well as a concentration around Bennett Lake at the end of the Chilkoot Trail (Jilkhoot). Otherwise, Tlingit is not found in Canada. Tlingit legend tells that groups of Tlingit once inhabited the Stikine, Nass, and Skeena river valleys during their migrations from the interior. There is a small group of speakers (some 85) in Washington as well.

Use and revitalization efforts 
Golla (2007) reported a decreasing population of 500 speakers in Alaska. The First Peoples' Cultural Council (2014) reported 2 speakers in Canada out of an ethnic population of 400.

As of 2013, Tlingit courses are available at the University of Alaska Southeast. In April 2014, Alaska HB 216 recognized Tlingit as an official language of Alaska, lending support to language revitalization.

Dialects
Tlingit is divided into roughly five major dialects, all of which are essentially mutually intelligible:
 The Northern dialect is also called the Yakutat (Yakhwdaat) dialect, after its principal town and is spoken in an area south from Lituya Bay (Litu.aa) to Frederick Sound.
 The Transitional dialect, a two-tone dialect like the Northern dialect but has phonological features of the Southern, is historically spoken in the villages of Petersburg (Gántiyaakw Séedi "Steamboat Canyon"), Kake (Khéixh'  "Daylight"), and Wrangell (Khaachxhana.áak'w "Khaachxhan's Little Lake"), and in the surrounding regions although it has almost disappeared.
 The similarly-moribund Southern dialects of Sanya and Heinya are spoken from Sumner Strait south to the Alaska-Canada border, excepting Annette Island, which is the reservation of the Tsimshian, and the southern end of Prince of Wales Island, which is the land of the Kaigani Haida (K'aayk'aani).
 The Inland Tlingit dialect is spoken in Canada around Atlin Lake and Teslin Lake.
 The Tongass Tlingit dialect was once spoken in the Cape Fox area south of Ketchikan but recently died with its last speakers in the 1990s.

The various dialects of Tlingit can be classified roughly into two-tone and three-tone systems. Tongass Tlingit, however, has no tone but a four-way register contrast between short, long, glottalized, and "fading" vowels. (In the last type, the onset of the vowel is articulated normally but the release is murmured, essentially a rapid opening of the glottis once articulation is begun.)

The tone values in two-tone dialects can be predicted in some cases from the three-tone values but not the reverse. Earlier, it was hypothesized that the three-tone dialects were older and that the two-tone dialects evolved from them. However, Jeff Leer's discovery of the Tongass dialect in the late 1970s has shown that the Tongass vowel system is adequate to predict the tonal features of both the two-tone and three-tone dialects, but none of the tonal dialects could be used to predict vocalic feature distribution in Tongass Tlingit. Thus, Tongass Tlingit is the most conservative of the various dialects of Tlingit, preserving contrasts which have been lost in the other dialects.

The fading and glottalized vowels in Tongass Tlingit have also been compared with similar systems in the Coast Tsimshian dialect. However, Krauss and Leer (1981, p. 165) point out that the fading vowels in Coastal Tsimshian are the surface realization of underlying sequences of vowel and glottalized sonorant, . That is in contradistinction to the glottal modifications in Tongass Tlingit, which Leer argues are symmetric with the modifications of the consonantal system. Thus, a fading vowel  is symmetric with an aspirated consonant , and a glottalized vowel  is symmetric with an ejective (glottalized) consonant . That implies that the two systems have no familial relationship. Leer (1978) speculated that the maintenance of the pretonal system in Tongass Tlingit was caused by the proximity of its speakers around the Cape Fox area near the mouth of the Portland Canal to speakers of Coastal Tsimshian, just to the south.

Phonology

Tlingit has a complex phonological system compared to Indo-European languages such as English or Spanish. It has an almost complete series of ejective consonants accompanying its stop, fricative, and affricate consonants.

Consonants
The consonants in the table are given in the IPA, with the popular orthography equivalents in brackets. Marginal or historical phonemes are given in parentheses.

{| class="wikitable" style="text-align: center"
|-
! rowspan=2 colspan=2| 
! rowspan=2 | Labial
! colspan=3 | Alveolar
! rowspan=2 | Palato-alveolar
! colspan=2 | Velar
! colspan=2 | Uvular
! colspan=2 | Glottal
|-
! plain || sibilant || lateral
! plain || labial
! plain || labial
! plain || labial
|-
! rowspan=3 | Plosive
! unaspirated
| 
|  
|  
|  
|  
|  
|  
|  
|  
|  
|  
|-
! aspirated
| 
|  
|  
|  
|  
|  
|  
|  
|  
| 
|
|-
! ejective
| 
|  
|  
|  
|  
|  
|  
|  
|  
| 
| 
|-
! rowspan=2 | Fricative
! voiceless
| 
|
|  
|  
|  
|  
|  
|  
|  
|  
|  
|-
! ejective
| 
|
|  
|  
| 
|  
|  
|  
|  
| 
| 
|-
! colspan=2 | Sonorant
|  
|  
|
|  
|  
|  
|  
| 
| 
| 
| 
|}

Native speakers in a teaching position may admonish learners when they produce these assimilated forms, deriding them as "not Tlingit" or "too English", but it is common to later hear such speakers producing those forms themselves. It is uncertain whether this assimilation is autochthonous or if it arose from contact with English, but the former is more likely from a purely-articulatory perspective.

Young speakers and second-language learners are increasingly making a voiced/unvoiced distinction between consonants, rather than the traditional unaspirated/aspirated distinction. That is because of the influence of English, which makes a similar distinction. For speakers who make the voiced/unvoiced distinction, the distribution is symmetrical with the unaspirated/aspirated distinction among other speakers.

Maddieson, Smith, and Bessel (2001) note that all word final non-ejective stops are phonemically unaspirated. That contrasts with the orthography that typically represents them as aspirated stops: t  for the more accurate d . There is a wide variation in ordinary speech, ranging from unreleased  to a very delayed aspiration . However, the underlying phoneme is certainly unaspirated  since it is consistently produced when the word is suffixed. The orthography usually but not always reflects that: hít "house" is written (du) hídi "(his) house" when marked with the possessive suffix -ÿí. It is possible but has not been verified that aspirated and unaspirated stops are collapsed into a single phoneme word-finally.

Maddieson and colleagues also confirm that the ejective fricatives in Tlingit are in fact true ejectives, despite the widely-held assumption that ejective fricatives are not actually phonetically ejective but are as a sequence of fricative and glottal stop. In Tlingit, at least, the articulation of ejective fricatives includes complete closure of the glottis before frication begins, and the larynx is raised in the same manner as with ejective stops.

Characteristically, the ejective fricatives in Tlingit feature a much smaller aperture for frication than is found in ordinary fricatives. That articulation provides increased resistance to counter the continual loss of dynamic airstream pressure. Also, ejective fricatives appear to include tightening of the pharyngeal muscles, which reduces the diameter of the air column and so further increases pressure. That pharyngeal constriction is not true pharyngealization, however, since the diameter is still greater than what is found in pharyngealized consonants in other languages.

Vowels

Tlingit has eight vowels, four vowels further distinguished formally by length. However, the length distinction is often in terms of tenseness rather than length, particularly in rapid speech. For the Northern dialect, the dominant spoken dialect of Tlingit and the standard for written Tlingit, every vowel may take either high or low tone; in the orthography high tone is indicated by an acute accent (áa) and low tone is unmarked (aa). The Southern and Transitional dialects have a mid tone which is unmarked and additional low tone which is marked by a grave accent (àa).

The Inland Tlingit orthography does not use vowel digraphs. Instead, short high vowels are marked with an acute accent, long high vowels are marked with a circumflex, and long low vowels are marked with a grave accent. Short low vowels are unmarked. Coastal Tlingit <áa> and <aa> are Inland <â> and <à> respectively. Coastal <éi> and <ei> are Inland <ê> and <è>, Coastal <ée> and <ee> are Inland <î> and <ì>, and Coastal <óo> and <oo> are Inland <û> and <ù>.

{| class="wikitable" style="text-align: center"
|-
! rowspan=2|
! colspan=3| Tense/Long
! colspan=3| Lax/Short
|-
! front || central || back
! front || central || back
|-
! close
|  
| 
|  
|  
| 
|  
|-
! mid
|  
| 
| 
|  
| 
|  
|-
! open
| 
|  
|
| 
|
| 
|}

Word onset is always consonantal in Tlingit and so words never begin with a vowel. The former is universal in single words, and both are found in word-medial position in compounds. For example:

But when the perfective prefix ÿu- is word-initial, the glottal stop appears to ensure that the word begins with a consonant.

Writing system

Until the late 1960s, Tlingit was written exclusively in phonetic transcription in the works of linguists and anthropologists except for a little-known Cyrillic alphabet used for publications by the Russian Orthodox Church. A number of amateur anthropologists doing extensive work on the Tlingit had no training in linguistics and so left numerous samples in vague and inconsistent transcriptions, the most famous being George T. Emmons. However, such noted anthropologists as Franz Boas, John R. Swanton, and Frederica de Laguna have transcribed Tlingit in various related systems that feature accuracy and consistency but sacrifice readability.

Two problems ensue from the multiplicity of transcription systems used for Tlingit. One is that there are many of them, thus requiring any reader to learn each individual system depending on what sources are used. The other is that most transcriptions made before Boas's study of Tlingit have numerous mistakes in them, particularly because of misinterpretations of the short vowels and ejective consonants. Accuracy of transcription can be increased by checking against similar words in other systems, or against a modern work postdating Naish and Story's work in the 1960s.

Grammar

Tlingit grammar at first glance appears to be highly fusional, but this is an incorrect assumption. There are predictable processes by which the basic phonetic shapes of individual morphemes are modified to fit various phonological requirements. These processes can be described with a regular language, and such descriptions are given here on a per morpheme basis by giving rule schemas for the context sensitive phonological modification of base morphemes. Analyzing all the possible combinations of morphemes and phonological contexts in Tlingit and constructing a regular language to describe them is a daunting but tractable task.

Despite not being a fusional language, Tlingit is still highly synthetic as an agglutinating language, and is even polysynthetic to some extent. The verb, as with all the Na-Dené languages, is characteristically incorporating. Nouns are in comparison relatively simple, with many being derived from verbs.

Word order

Tlingit word order is SOV when non-pronominal agent and object phrases both exist in the sentence. However, there is a strong urge to restrict the argument of the verb phrase to a single non-pronominal noun phrase, with any other phrases being extraposed from the verb phrase. If a noun phrase occurs outside of the verb phrase then it is typically represented in the verb phrase by an appropriate pronoun.

Nouns
See main article: Tlingit noun

Pronominals

Tlingit has a complex system of pronominals, which vary depending on their relationship to the verb. The subject pronominals are incorporated into the verb in its subject slot. The object pronominals are also technically incorporated into the verb (i.e. the verb "complex"), but most are graphically independent. They are divided into three classes, the verbal object, nominal object, and postpositional object. There are also the independent pronominals which are completely separate from the verb and can be used in dependent clauses or in subject or object position.

The pronominals all have related semantic values, and their organization can hence easily be visualized in a table.

{| class="wikitable"
!rowspan=2|Type !!rowspan=2| Subject !!colspan=3| Object !!rowspan=2| Independent
|-
!                                   VO    !!  NO  !!  PO
|-
| 1 SINGULAR    || xha-||xhat, axh|| axh  || xha- || xhát
|-
| 1 PLURAL    || too-|| haa     || haa  ||      || uháan
|-
| 2 SINGULAR    || ee- || i-      || i    ||      || wa.é
|-
| 2 PLURAL    || yi- || yee-    || yee  ||      || yeewáan*
|-
| 3 RECESSIVE   ||     || a-, 0-  || a    || a-   ||
|-
| 3 NEUTRAL   || 0-  || a-, 0-  || du   || u-   || hú
|-
| 3 SALIENT   ||     || ash     || ash  ||      ||
|-
| REFLEXIVE   ||     || sh-, 0- || chush||      ||
|-
| RECIPROCAL  ||     || woosh   || woosh||      ||
|-
| INDEFINITEHUMAN   ||du-||khu-, khaa-|| khaa || khu- ||
|-
| INDEFINITENON HUMAN   ||     || at-     || at   ||      ||
|-
| PARTITIVE   ||     || aa-     ||      ||      ||
|}

The numbers in the first column represent the usual concept of person, i.e. first, second, or third. Story and Naish identified a fourth person, but this term is inappropriate since they did not describe a clear separation between the so-called fourth person and the other impersonal pronominals.

When analyzing a sentence, the pronominal type is given first, then the form (subject, object, independent) is given following a period. This uniquely represents the pronominal as a two dimensional unit. Thus 1SINGULAR SUBJECT is the first person singular subject pronominal, realized as xhat. The RECIPROCAL does not uniquely identify one of the two reciprocal pronominals, but since they are both phonetically identical as woosh, it is generally unnecessary to uniquely identify them.

There is also a notional zeroth person which can be of subject, object, or independent form. This is not realized in Tlingit, instead it is an empty placeholder for analysis.

Subject pronominals

The subject pronominals are all incorporated into the verb. Thus when the subject is represented as a pronominal, the subject position of the sentence is empty.

Object pronominals

Object pronominals are divided into three classes, the verbal, nominal, and postpositional.

The verbal object pronominals function similarly to the subject pronominals in that they preclude an explicit object when used.

The nominal object pronominals are similar in some respects to the possessive pronouns of English. They precede a noun and represent the object of the noun, typically implying possession of the noun.

Postpositional object pronominals function as objects to which postpositions are attached. They act as the object of a postposition in a manner similar to an ordinary noun suffixed with a postposition.

Directionals

Strictly speaking, the Tlingit directionals can be classified as nouns on the basis of their syntactic function. However, they form a distinct semantic set of nouns which indicate direction relative to some stated position. They also show stem variation depending locative suffixation, in particular with the allative suffix -dei. These stem variants also occur with the adverb construction N1-da-N2-(i)n "N2 N1-ward" where N2 is an anatomic noun and N1 is a directional stem.

{|class="wikitable"
!                !! Noun !! N-dei !! N-naa !! Adverb (+15)
|-
| up above || (di-)kée || (di-)kín-dei || (di-)kee-naa || kei, kéi
|-
| down below || (di-)yée || (di-)yín-dei || (di-)yee-naa || yei, yéi, yaa
|-
| upstream || naakée || nán-dei || naa-nyaa ~ naa-naa || –
|-
| downstream || ix-kée, éex || íx-dei || ixi-naa || –
|-
| from landshore, interior || dáakh || dákh-dei || dakhi-naa || daakh
|-
| toward landshore || éekh || íkh-dei || ikhi-naa || yeikh ~ eekh
|-
| toward seashore || yán || yán-dei || — || yan
|-
| from seashore, out to sea || dei-kí || dák-dei || daki-naa ~ diki-naa || daak
|-
| across, other side || diyáa || diyáa-dei || — || yan
|-
| inside || neil || neil-dei || — || neil
|-
| outside || gáan || gán-dei || — || —
|-
| back || — || khúxh-dei || — || khuxh
|-
| aground, shallow water || — || kúx-dei || — || kux
|}

Particles

Particles function as neither noun nor verb. They are restricted to positions relative to phrases in the sentence.

Focus particles

The focus particles follow the left periphery ("forephrase" per Leer) of a sentence. The Naish-Story term for them is "post-marginals". Many of them may be suffixed with a demonstrative (-yá, -hé, -wé, -yú), and they may also be combined with the interrogative (-gé). Focus particles are stylistically written as separate words, but phonetically, they may be indivisible from the preceding utterance.

 sá — wh-question
 gé — dubitative, unlikelihood, "perhaps", "maybe, "it would seem..."
 á — focus
 ágé — interrogative (< á + gé)
 ásé — discovery, understanding of previously unclear information, "oh, so..."
 ásgé — second hand information, "I hear...", "they say..." (< ásé + gé)
 khu.aa — contrastive, "however"
 xháa – softening, "you see"
 shágdéi — dubitative, likelihood, "perhaps", "probably"
 dágáa — emphatic assertion, "indeed", "for sure"
 shéi — mild surprise
 gwáa, gu.áa — strong surprise
 gwshéi, gushéi — rhetorical interrogative, request for corroboration, "I wonder", "perhaps"
 óosh — hypothetical, "as if", "even if", "if only"

The combination of the focus á with the demonstratives gives the frequently used particles áyá and áwé, and the less common áhé and áyú. Combination of the interrogative ágé with the demonstratives gives the confirmative particles ákwé and ákyá (ák-hé and ákyú are uncommon), used to elicit a yes/no response from the listener.

The interrogative ágé also usually contracts to ág before tsú "also": ág tsú "also?" < ágé + tsú.

The particle sá is obligatory in forming wh-question phrases. It can be combined with a demonstrative, the dubitative, the rhetorical interrogative, and the emphatic assertion:

 sáwé (< sá + áwé), sáyá, ... — focused question, "... is that?"
 sgé (< sá + gé) — dubitative question, "maybe?", "perhaps?"
 ságwshéi — "I wonder?"
 sdágáa (< sá + dágáa) — "(what) on earth?", "really?"

Phrasal particles

Phrasal particles may occur after focus particles that occur with or without demonstrative finals. The following are postphrasal particles, thus they may only occur after the phrase that they modify.

 tsá — "only then"
 tsú — "also"
 s'é — "first", "really!"
 déi — "now", "this time"
 x'wán — "be sure to"
 tsé — "be sure not to"

Except for x'wán and tsé, the above may occur after the focus particles.

The following are prephrasal particles, i.e. they occur before the phrase that they modify. Naish and Story call these "pre-marginals".

 ch'a — "just", "the very"
 ch'as — "only", "just"
 ch'ú — "even"
 tlaxh — "very"

Mobile particles

These particles may occur before or after any phrase in a clause.

 tlei — "just," "simply," "just then"
 déi — "already," "by now"
 tsu — "again", "still", "some more"

Compare the mobile particle tsu with the postphrasal particle tsú. Both the sentence káaxwei tsu eetéenaxh xhat yatee "I need more coffee" and the sentence káaxwei tsú eetéenaxh xhat yatee "I also need coffee" are acceptable. However the sentence *tsú káaxwei eetéenaxh xhat yatee is syntactically inadmissible because the particle tsú is postphrasal, i.e. it cannot precede the phrase it modifies, in this case the noun phrase káaxwei. The corresponding sentence with the tsu particle in front, tsu káaxwei eetéenaxh xhat yatee  "I need coffee again/still" is in contrast syntactically acceptable. Thus a Tlingit listener will recognize the tsu particle in a phrase-initial position without confusion but tone is necessary to distinguish it in a phrase-final position. For this reason the tsu particle is often used prephrasally although it is syntactically admitted in either position. Thus the song name Tsu Héidei Shugaxhtootaan could also be héidei tsu shugaxhtootaan, but placing the tsu in front has the advantage of unambiguity, and thus seems more euphonious to native speakers.

Sentence-initial particles

These particles may only occur at the front of a sentence. Naish-Story term these "clause marginals".

 tléik, l — negative, "not"
 gwál — dubitative, "perhaps"
 gu.aal — optative, "hopefully"
 khaju, xhaju — contrary, "actually", "in fact"
 khashde — "I thought..."

Tlingit-language media
The Irish TV series An Klondike (2015–17), set in Canada in the 1890s, contains Tlingit dialog.

References

Further reading

 Beck, David. (2001). "Conventionality and lexical classes", pp. 19–26 in Proceedings of WSCLA 5: The Workshop on Structure and Constituency in Languages of the Americas, Gessner, Suzanne; Oh, Sunyoung; & Shiobara, Kayono (eds.). Volume 5 of Working Papers in Linguistics. University of British Columbia: Vancouver, British Columbia.
 Bird, Sonya. (2001). "What is a word? Evidence from a computational approach to Navajo verbal morphology", pp. 27–35 in Proceedings of WSCLA 5: The Workshop on Structure and Constituency in Languages of the Americas, Gessner, Suzanne; Oh, Sunyoung; & Shiobara, Kayono (eds.). Volume 5 of Working Papers in Linguistics. University of British Columbia: Vancouver, British Columbia.
 Boas, Franz. (1917). Grammatical notes on the language of the Tlingit Indians. University of Pennsylvania Museum anthropological publications.
 Cable, Seth. (2004). A metrical analysis of syncope in Tlingit. Manuscript. 
 Dauenhauer, Nora M.; & Dauenhauer, Richard (Eds.). (1987). Haa Shuká, Our Ancestors. Number 1 in Classics of Tlingit Oral Literature. University of Washington & Sealaska Heritage Foundation: Seattle, Washington.
 ——— (1990). Haa Tuwunáagu Yís, For Healing Our Spirit. Number 2 in Classics of Tlingit Oral Literature. University of Washington & Sealaska Heritage Foundation: Seattle, Washington.
 ——— (Eds.). (1994). Haa K̲usteeyí, Our Culture: Tlingit life stories. Number 3 in Classics of Tlingit Oral Literature. University of Washington & Sealaska Heritage Foundation: Seattle, Washington.
 ——— (Eds.). (1995). "A Tlingit ceremonial speech by Willie Marks", pp. 239–244 in Dürr, M; Renner, E.; & Oleschinski, W. (Eds.), Language and Culture in Native North America: Studies in honor of Heinz-Jürgen Pinnow. Number 2 in LINCOM Studies in Native American Linguistics. LINCOM: Munich, Germany. .
 ——— (2000). Beginning Tlingit, 4th ed. Sealaska Heritage Foundation Press: Juneau, Alaska. . First edition 1994.
 ——— (2002). Lingít X̲'éinax̲ Sá! Say it in Tlingit: A Tlingit phrase book. Sealaska Heritage Institute: Juneau, Alaska. .
 ——— (2002). Intermediate Tlingit (draft). Manuscript.
 Dauenhauer, Richard. (1974). Text and context of Tlingit oral tradition. PhD dissertation. University of Wisconsin: Madison, Wisconsin.
 Dryer, Matthew. (1985). "Tlingit: An object-initial language?", Canadian Journal of Linguistics 30:1–13.
 Goddard, Pliny Earle. (1920). "Has Tlingit a genetic relationship to Athapascan", International Journal of American Linguistics 1:266–279.
 Leer, Jeffery A. (1979). Proto-Athabaskan Verb Stem Variation, Part One: Phonology. Volume 1 in Alaska Native Language Center Research Papers. Alaska Native Language Center: Fairbanks, Alaska.
 ——— (1990). Tlingit: A portmanteau language family? In P. Baldi (Ed.), Linguistics change and reconstruction methodology (pp. 73–98). Mouton de Gruyter: Berlin, Germany.
 ——— (1991). The Schetic Categories of the Tlingit verb.  PhD dissertation. University of Chicago Department of Linguistics: Chicago, Illinois.
 ——— (2000). "The negative/irrealis category in Athabaskan–Eyak–Tlingit", ch. 6 pp. 101–138 in The Athabaskan Languages: Perspectives on a Native American Language Family, Fernald, Theodore B. & Platero, Paul R. (eds.). Volume 24 in Oxford Studies in Anthropological Linguistics. Oxford University Press: Oxford, England. .
 Leer, Jeff; Hitch, David; & Ritter, John. (2001). Interior Tlingit Noun Dictionary: The dialects spoken by Tlingit elders of Carcross and Teslin, Yukon, and Atlin, British Columbia. Yukon Native Language Center: Whitehorse, Yukon. .
 Maddieson, Ian; Smith, Caroline L.; & Bessell, Nicola. (2001). Aspects of the phonetics of Tlingit. Anthropological Linguistics 43(2): 135–176.
 Naish, Constance M. (1966). A syntactic study of Tlingit. Master's dissertation. University of North Dakota.
 Naish, Constance M.; & Story, Gillian L. (1973). Tlingit verb dictionary. Summer Institute of Linguistics: College, Alaska. 
 ——— (1996). The English-Tlingit dictionary: Nouns (3rd ed.; H. Davis & J. Leer, Eds.). Sheldon Jackson College: Sitka, Alaska. (Revision of the Naish-Story dictionary of 1963.)
 Pinnow, Heinz-Jürgen. (1962). "Two problems of the historical phonology of Na-Dene languages". International Journal of American Linguistics, 28:162–166.
 ——— (1966). Grundzüge einer historischen Lautlehre des Tlingit: ein Versuch. Wiesbaden: Harrassowitz.
 ——— (1976). Geschichte der Na-Dene-Forschung. (Indiana : Beihefte ; 5). Berlin: Mann. 
 Swanton, John. (1911). "Tlingit", pp. 159–204 in Handbook of American Indian Languages. U.S. Government Printing Office: Washington, D.C.

External links

 Lingít Yoo X̲'atángi: The Tlingit Language
 A Grammar of the Tlingit Language
 Tlingit Example Sentences with Audio Collection of over 1,500 audio recordings of spoken Tlingit example sentences, compiled as part of a Sealaska Heritage Institute project funded by the Administration for Native Americans between 2005 and 2009. (Online since Oct 2022.)
 Tlingit Teaching and Learning Aids
 Tlingit Noun Dictionary
 Tlingit Verb Dictionary (unfinished)
 Tongass Text
 Alaskan Orthodox texts (Tlingit), 1812–1920 (cf. The Alaskan Orthodox Texts Project celebrates its 10th anniversary, May 2015)
 The Russian Church and Native Alaskan Cultures: Preserving Native Languages
 Yukon Native Language Centre
 Talking about Beliefs: The Alaskan Tlingit language today
 Tlingit basic lexicon at the Global Lexicostatistical Database
 Anash Interactive
 Tlingit (Intercontinental Dictionary Series)
 Tlingit Information at Languagegeek
 Dictionary of Tlingit , 2009, Keri Edwards, Sealaska Heritage Institute, Juneau, Alaska; Tlingit-English/English-Tlingit, grammar at the end

+
Na-Dene languages
Subject–object–verb languages
Northern Northwest Coast Sprachbund (North America)
Northwest Coast Sprachbund (North America)
Indigenous languages of the Pacific Northwest Coast
Indigenous languages of the North American Subarctic
Indigenous languages of Alaska
First Nations languages in Canada
Languages of the United States
Endangered Dené–Yeniseian languages
Native American language revitalization
Official languages of Alaska